The chief minister is the chief executive of the Indian state. In accordance with the Constitution of India, the governor is a state's de jure head, but de facto executive authority rests with the chief minister. Following elections to the legislative assembly, the state's governor usually invites the party (or coalition) with a majority of seats to form the government. The governor appoints the chief minister, whose council of ministers are collectively responsible to the assembly. Given that she has the confidence of the assembly, the chief minister's term is for five years and is subject to no term limits.

Since 1963, India has had 16 female chief ministers. The first woman to become chief minister was Sucheta Kripalani of the Indian National Congress party, who was sworn in on 2 October 1963 as chief minister of Uttar Pradesh. The longest-serving female chief minister was Sheila Dikshit, who served as the chief minister of the National Capital Territory of Delhi for the Indian National Congress and held the office for over fifteen years. J. Jayalalithaa, former general secretary of the All India Anna Dravida Munnetra Kazhagam, served as chief minister of Tamil Nadu and has the second-longest tenure; she held the office until her death in 2016, becoming the first female chief minister to die in office, while V. N. Janaki Ramachandran of the same state and party has the shortest tenure (only 23 days). Only 12 states and 1 union territory in India had female chief ministers, out of 28 states and 8 union territories. Mamata Banerjee of West Bengal is the only female incumbent chief minister in India.

Chronological list 

Key

  Incumbent Chief Minister
  Assassinated or died in office

  Resigned
  Resigned following a no-confidence motion

See also 
 List of female Indian governors and lieutenant governors
 List of female judges of the Supreme Court of India
 List of current Indian chief ministers
 List of current Indian deputy chief ministers
 List of longest-serving Indian chief ministers
 List of chief ministers from the Bharatiya Janata Party
 List of chief ministers from the Communist Party of India (Marxist)
 List of chief ministers from the Indian National Congress

Notes

References 

 
Chief ministers
Women